Crimora School, also known as Crimora Grammar School, is a historic public school building located at Crimora, Augusta County, Virginia. The original section was built in 1927, and is a brick building consisting of an auditorium/gymnasium as the core of the building with rectangular gabled blocks on either side containing two rooms with the projecting gable ends.  It is in a Vernacular Bungalow style. The school was subsequently expanded in the 1930s and in 1942. In 1954–55, the school was again enlarged with a large brick veneer rear addition containing six classrooms, a cafeteria, teacher's lounge, library and office.

It was listed on the National Register of Historic Places in 1985.

References

School buildings on the National Register of Historic Places in Virginia
School buildings completed in 1927
Schools in Augusta County, Virginia
National Register of Historic Places in Augusta County, Virginia
1927 establishments in Virginia